At the Edge of the Great Void (Au Bord du Grand Rien) is volume nineteen in the French comic book (or bande dessinée) science-fiction series Valérian and Laureline created by writer Pierre Christin and artist Jean-Claude Mézières. It is the first part of a trilogy of stories, continued in The Order of the Stones (2007) and The Open-Time (2010).

Synopsis

Among the asteroids at the edge of the mysterious Great Void, where the universe is still in formation, Valérian and Laureline along with a Schniarfeur living weapon are working as travelling salesmen, hawking their wares from a battered old space truck, frequently harassed by the local police force who take their orders from the Triumvirate of Rubanis. At one of their stops they befriend a young girl, Ky-Gaï, who has lost her job after the spacesuit factory in which she worked closed down. Laureline takes Ky-Gaï on as an assistant. When some of their merchandise is stolen by the Limboz, creatures from the Great Void who have lost their planet, Valérian and Laureline give chase. Catching the Limboz, Valérian agrees to let them go only if they'll give them information about the location of the Earth which Valérian and Laureline believe is located somewhere in the Great Void.

Acting on the information given by the Limboz, Valérian and Laureline make for Port Abyss, the only free port at the edge of the Great Void. There they meet Singh'a Rough'a, a space captain who is mounting a voyage of exploration into the Great Void. Singh'a Rough'a takes an interest in the spacesuits that Laureline is selling; she needs them for her expedition crew. However, while Laureline and Singh'a Rough'a are negotiating, the police, acting under the orders of the Triumvirate of Rubanis, arrive and arrest Valérian and the Schniarfeur.

While Valérian and Schniarfeur languish in prison, Laureline and Ky-Gaï return to Ky-Gaï's old factory; they have the notion of re-opening it so that they can make the spacesuits to fulfill Singh'a Rough'a's order. As they go to work, Laureline confesses to Ky-Gaï that she and Valérian are only posing as merchants – in reality they are trying to find the location of Earth.

At the prison, Valérian gets talking to one of his fellow prisoners who tells him of an encounter he had with a mysterious stone that appeared to be alive. This tallies with what the Limboz had earlier told Valérian and Laureline. Bribing one of the guards, Valérian and Schniarfeur make their escape and rendezvous with Laureline and Ky-Gaï, who are bringing the finished spacesuits to Singh'a Rough'a. Laureline realises that the Great Void is too dangerous a place to bring Ky-Gaï; Valérian gives her the Schniarfeur, who has been studying business administration, as a present and the two decide to re-open the spacesuit factory as a business together.

In the Great Void, the Triumvirate of Rubanis meet with one of the giant sentient stones, the Wolochs. The Wolochs tell the Triumvirate that Valérian and Laureline have escaped and that they are not happy about Singh'a Rough'a's expedition.

Evading the police, Valérian and Laureline reach Singh'a Rough'a's ship, impressing her sufficiently that she allows them to join her crew. As the ship departs Port Abyss for the Great Void, Valérian and Laureline ponder whether they will find their lost Earth.

Notes

This album is the first in a trilogy, unofficially called In Search of the Lost Earth. The second installment, The Order of the Stones was released in 2007. The third and final installment, The Open Time, was released in 2010.
This is the first time since it made its debut album appearance in Empire of a Thousand Planets that Valérian and Laureline's astroship has failed to appear in a Valérian album.
The merchandise that Valérian and Laureline are selling all comes from the planet Syrte, last seen in Empire of a Thousand Planets.
Schniarfeurs were previously seen in the albums The Living Weapons and Hostages of the Ultralum.
The Triumvirate of Rubanis first came together in the album The Circles of Power; triumvirate member Colonel T'loc first appeared in The Ghosts of Inverloch.
Singh'a Rough'a's first officer Lieutenant Molto Cortes is based upon Hugo Pratt's Corto Maltese, a long running Italian comics character.

External links
Dargaud micro-site for this album

2004 graphic novels
Valérian and Laureline